Rubber bulbs are used in chemistry laboratories, by placing them on top of a glass or plastic tube. It serves as a vacuum source for filling reagents through a pipette or pasteur pipette and also help control the flow of liquid from the dropping bottle. By using rubber bulb, the contact of the mouth to the chemicals can be avoided. These rubber rods come in different shapes, sizes and colors.

Large rubber bulbs

The larger rubber bulbs are commonly used to draw liquid through a pipette when the reagents are needed in a larger amount. These rubber bulbs will compliment larger pipettes and plastic rods, as the glass will easily break due to uneven pressure distribution.

Small rubber bulbs

The smaller rubber bulbs are well suited with small pipettes to draw smaller amount of reagents and can attach to both glass, as well as plastic rods. They are very commonly used for droppers as small sized rubber bulbs help control the amount of drops more precisely.

Rubber bulb alternatives

The rubber bulbs can also be replaced with wheel style pipette filler or flip style pipette filler. The flip style pipette fillers have two valves system and have a removable top valve which makes cleaning easy and it can be used with one hand. The plastic wheel style pump help reduce the amount of work done by the users, as there are no squeezing involved. The liquid is drawn up by use of wheel movement and can be easily released by using the lever. They are also easy to clean.

See also
 Pipette
 Pasteur pipette
 Automated pipetting system

References 

Laboratory equipment